The 2013 Melbourne Football Club season was the club's 114th year in the VFL/AFL since it began in 1897.

Mark Neeld entered into his second year as senior coach of Melbourne. After a horrid season in 2012, Neeld made a vast amount of list changes in the 2012 AFL Draft. These changes included the addition of experienced and key position players from other clubs such as Shannon Byrnes, Tom Gillies, Chris Dawes, David Rodan and Cameron Pedersen. Melbourne also added five new players from the National Draft, two new players from the Rookie Draft as well as one new player from the  Mini-Draft who will play in 2014. Jack Grimes and Jack Trengove continued their roles as co-captains of the football club.

With no Friday night games and only three home games against fellow Victorian sides at the MCG, Melbourne faced a financially challenging fixture. At the same time Melbourne received a simple fixture when compared to other teams by playing fellow-cellar dwellers in 2012 ,  and  twice and all 2012 finalists with the exception of  once. Melbourne hosted nine home games at the MCG, a sold home game against  at TIO Stadium in Round 17 and a home game against  at Etihad Stadium in Round 18.

Melbourne endured one of their worst seasons in the club's 155-year history and arguably their worst in the modern era. They finished with only 2 wins (their least since the 1981 season) and a percentage of 54.07% (their worst since the 1919 season). It was also the worst seasonal performance from an established club since the demise of Fitzroy in 1996.

2013 list changes

2012 free agency

2012 trades

Retirements and delistings

Mini-draft

National draft

Rookie draft

2013 squad

2013 season

Pre-season

NAB Cup

Week 1

Week 2

Week 3

NAB Challenge

Week 4

Home and away season

Overview
The 2013 season for Melbourne turned out to be disastrous to such an extraordinary magnitude that they required a complete refurbishment of their board and football department. Melbourne began the season as marginal favourites at home against fellow cellar dwellers . However they displayed such visible problems with their ball use, work rate and turnover rate in the midfield that they were eventually shut out of the game and hammered by 79 points. After a week of media scrutiny over their Round 1 performance, Melbourne was expected to put in place a more spirited performance against . For the opening proportion of that game, they appeared to have lifted their intensity. However, after Essendon scored consecutive goals, Melbourne's problems from Round 1 occurred again and they were eventually slaughtered by 148 points. This was their greatest losing margin at the MCG in their entire VFL/AFL history. Fan backlash resulted from this enormous loss and the next week on 9 April, Melbourne made the decision to sack their CEO Cameron Schwab.

After a week of team bonding in Sorrento, Melbourne appeared to have turned around their form in Round 3 against , only trailing by 10 points at half time. However, by the time West Coast kicked consecutive goals in the second half, Melbourne would again shut down and eventually get hammered by 94 points. With an average losing margin of 108 points in the first 3 rounds, Melbourne headed into their Round 4 clash against recent expansion team  at the MCG, in what was a must win game for Mark Neeld so that he may have maintained his coaching role. In a game of sub-standard football from both sides, Melbourne looked to be set to lose at 3 quarter time trailing by 19 points however managed to blow the game away with their highest ever quarter score in VFL/AFL history of 12 goals and 2 behinds to win by 41 points. In subsequent rounds Melbourne's form didn't show any improvement from Round 4 however as the pressure for Mark Neeld to keep his job oscillated out of control.

During Melbourne's bye, 2 major personnel changes would occur to the club. On 13 June, Melbourne president Don McLardy resigned and was replaced by vice-president Peter Spargo as an interim-president. 3 days later after weeks of pressure Mark Neeld was finally sacked from his senior coaching position and replaced by former  senior coach Neil Craig. Craig's first game coaching Melbourne was against fellow cellar dwellers . Despite Melbourne controlling more possession of the ball with more inside 50s, they still lost by 35 points due to their lack of forward pressure. Melbourne however finally broke through for only their second win of the season against  by 3 points. This came after Melbourne nearly conceded a 44-point lead midway through the final quarter by allowing the Western Bulldogs to kick the last 7 goals of the game.

After a gutsy performance against the 2012 premiers  where Melbourne went down by 31 points, they would finish their miserable season by falling back into the shut-down habits they experienced at the start of the season. Melbourne would finish the season with a woeful 2 wins and 54.07%.

Round 1

Round 2

Round 3

Round 4

Round 5

Round 6

Round 7

Round 8

Round 9

Round 10

Round 11

Round 12

Round 13

Round 14

Round 15

Round 16

Round 17

Round 18

Round 19

Round 20

Round 21

Round 22

Round 23

Ladder

Ladder breakdown by opposition

Football Department and Board Restructure
2013 was 's worst season in a horrible string of seasons dating back to the 2007 AFL season. As a result, many Melbourne personnel who were part of the Jim Stynes-led board or football department originating back to 2008 either resigned or were dismissed from their positions. Because many personnel were in the midst of their contracts, they required large pay-outs which Melbourne couldn't financially cope with.

On 19 February 2013, Melbourne were found not guilty from their tanking scandal originating from 2009. However, they received a $500,000 fine as the employers of the General Manager of Football Operations Chris Connolly and former Melbourne senior coach Dean Bailey, both of whom were found guilty in the investigation. Chris Connolly, who was still working at the Melbourne Football Club at the time the suspension was handed out received a 12-month suspension which prevented him from being involved at any club until 1 February 2014.

On 10 April 2013, four days after Melbourne's 148-point loss against , Cameron Schwab was asked to leave from his position as CEO after he originally had his contract renewed for a three-year term from 27 August by Don McLardy. Cameron Schwab accepted, and received an approximate $250,000 payout. Peter Spargo then took over as interim CEO before former Essendon CEO Peter Jackson took over the role on an interim basis for six months from 1 May 2013.

On 31 May 2013, Chris Connolly was given a two-year contract extension despite being in the process of serving his suspension.

On 3 June 2013, after a marathon scheduled board meeting in which Mark Neeld was speculated to be sacked from his role as Melbourne senior coach, Peter Jackson announced his findings from his first month as operating CEO of the club. He then proceeded to announce his recommendations to the club and agree to a contract extension until the end of 2014 to help carry out those recommendations. Neeld survived this board meeting.

On 6 June 2013, former Victorian Premier and former  President Jeff Kennett claimed that he had been approached by the Melbourne Football Club board to take over as Melbourne President and encouraged on supporters to call and extraordinary general meeting to oust Don McLardy.

On 14 June 2013, Peter Jackson and Don McLardy made a plea to the AFL to receive emergency funding in order to reshape the entire board and football department on the condition that they provided a detailed plan that would be strictly carried through. This included the removal of several key personnel, the prevention of Jeff Kennett's campaign as Melbourne president from becoming successful and the prevention of Stephen Dank's alleged text message to Melbourne's Football Department as part of Essendon's drug scandal from having any immediate impact on the funds received.

Also on 14 June 2013, Don McLardy announced his resignation as Melbourne Football Club president as well as the president of the Reach Foundation. Peter Spargo took over the role as Melbourne's interim president. In addition, Stuart Grimshaw resigned from his role on Melbourne's board.

On 17 June 2013, Peter Jackson announced the immediate termination of Mark Neeld's role as Melbourne senior coach only eighteen months into his three-year contract. He received a payout of around $600,000. Former Adelaide senior coach Neil Craig would take over as Melbourne's interim senior coach for the rest of the season.

On 25 June 2013, Melbourne's list manager Tim Harrington would have his contract terminated as Peter Jackson also advertised the new role of General Manager of Football Operations.

On 26 June 2013, Melbourne's vice-president Guy Jalland announced his resignation from the board. 3 days later on 29 June 2013, Karen Hayes also announced her resignation from the board.

On 11 July 2013, Peter Jackson announced his intention to snare former Sydney Swans and 2005 premiership coach Paul Roos to become the new senior coach of the Melbourne Football Club from 2014 onwards. Paul Roos however claimed that he had not warmed up to the idea for a return to senior-coaching.

On 12 July 2013, former  player and Bernie Naylor Medallist Glen Bartlett joined the Board of the Melbourne Football Club.

On 17 July 2013, the AFL finally gave a $2,500,000 bail out package for Melbourne to use for their proposed emergency funding.

On 16 August 2013, Glen Bartlett was appointed as the new president of the Melbourne Football Club defeating a bid made by former Victorian Treasurer Alan Stockdale.

On 6 September 2013, Paul Roos was announced as the new senior-coach of the Melbourne Football Club. He signed a $2,000,000 deal for two years with the option of a third year.

On 9 September 2013, Neil Craig announced his intentions to leave the club as he had no new place on Paul Roos' new football department. He was not offered a new contract along with forward-line coach Leigh Brown and midfield coach Brian Royal.

On 2 October 2013, former CEO of VicSport Kate Raffey joined the board as well as former Melbourne footballer Jeremy Nichols on 1 November 2013

On 10 October 2013, Chris Connolly had his contract terminated despite signing a two-year extension earlier in the year in order decrease the overall cost of Melbourne's management structure.

Melbourne's horrendous season of poor on-field form, tanking investigations, contract terminations, payouts and complete football department/board restructuring meant that they recorded a net loss of $1,700,000. This included a statutory loss of $3,100,000 with the AFL's bail out funding for 2013 of $1,450,000 not being taken into account.

Awards

Brownlow Medal tally

The 16 votes Melbourne collected in 2013 is the lowest ever by any team in a season under the 3-2-1 voting system.

Keith 'Bluey' Truscott Medal tally (top 10)

Keith 'Bluey' Truscott Trophy – Nathan Jones

Sid Anderson Memorial Trophy (Second in the Best and Fairest) – Colin Garland

Ron Barassi Snr Memorial Trophy (Third in the Best and Fairest) – Dean Terlich

Ivor Warne-Smith Memorial Trophy (Fourth in the Best and Fairest) – Matt Jones

Dick Taylor Memorial Trophy (Fifth in the Best and Fairest) – Colin Sylvia

Harold Ball Memorial Trophy (Best Young Player) – Jack Viney

Troy Broadbridge Trophy (highest polling MFC player in the Casey Best and Fairest) – Jesse Hogan

Ron Barassi Leadership Award – Colin Garland

Ian Ridley Club Ambassador Award – Colin Sylvia

Norm Smith Memorial Trophy (Coach's Award) – Jake Spencer

Leading Goalkicker Award – Jeremy Howe (28)

References

External links
 Official Website of the Melbourne Football Club
 Official Website of the AFL

2013
Melbourne Football Club